The following is a list of officially designated symbols of the U.S. state of North Dakota.

State symbols
The following are defined in Title 54 of the North Dakota Century Code and appear in the North Dakota Blue Book:
State bird: western meadowlark, Sturnella neglecta
State fish: northern pike, Esox lucius
Honorary equine: Nokota horse 
State flower: wild prairie rose, Rosa arkansana
State tree: American elm, Ulmus americana
State fossil: teredo petrified wood
State grass: western wheatgrass, Pascopyrum smithii (formerly Agropyron smithii)
State nicknames: Roughrider State, Flickertail State, Peace Garden State
State mottos 
Great Seal: Liberty and Union, Now and Forever, One and Inseparable
Coat of arms: Strength from the Soil
Latin motto: 
State song: "North Dakota Hymn"
State dance: square dance
State fruit: chokecherry
State march: "Flickertail March"
State beverage: milk
State insect:  convergent lady beetle (ladybug), Hippodamia convergens
State seal: The Great Seal of North Dakota: "A tree in the open field, the trunk of which is surrounded by three bundles of wheat; on the right a plow, anvil and sledge; on the left, a bow crossed with three arrows, and an Indian on horseback pursuing a buffalo toward the setting sun; the foliage of the tree arched by a half circle of forty-two stars, surrounded by the motto "Liberty and Union Now and Forever, One and Inseparable"; the words Great Seal at the top; the words State of North Dakota at the bottom; October 1 on the left and 1889 on the right."
State coat of arms:
"Device: On an Indian arrowhead point to base or a bend vert charged with three mullets of the first, in base a fleur-de-lis of the second.
Crest: On a wreath or and azure, a sheaf of three arrows argent armed and flighted gules behind a stringed bow fessways or with grip of the second (gules)."
State license plate: "The background has a blue and white sky above golden plains and hills with a buffalo and some grain on the plains. The phrase "Discover the Spirit" is at the top and the phrase "Peace Garden State" is below the state name at the bottom."

Unofficial symbols of North Dakota
State creed:
 "We believe in North Dakota, in the beauty of her skies, and in the glory of her prairies.
 We believe in the People of North Dakota, in their strength of Body and Mind, in their High Sense of Right, and in their Desire to establish a Great Commonwealth wherein the things that count for Human Welfare shall be first.
 We believe that by Thought and Act we can magnify our State and the Life of our People, bind the East and the West, the North and the South by Roadways, Communication and Good Will, and give our Sons and Daughters the Opportunity to Work at Useful Tasks within our borders.
 We pledge to those seeking new homes the Hand of Hospitality and extend to them a Welcome to our Commonwealth where they may find Peace and Happiness.
 We pledge that the freedom our Fathers won here and elsewhere shall continue as the Heritage of our Children.
 We, as a People, because of growing Intelligence and a Nobler Outlook, seek Unity of Purpose; we desire to lead a Richer Common Life, and hope to render a Larger Service to the State and the Nation."
State art museum: North Dakota Museum of Art
State slogan: Legendary
State websites:
ND state government: http://www.nd.gov
ND Department of Commerce: http://www.ndtourism.com
ND Parks and Recreation department: http://webarchive.loc.gov/all/20060602182636/http://www.ndparks.com/
ND Department of Health: http://ndhealth.gov
ND university system: http://www.ndus.edu
Job Service North Dakota: http://www.jobsnd.com

See also
List of North Dakota-related topics
Lists of United States state insignia
State of North Dakota

References

External links

State symbols
North Dakota